Joseph Adelard Fernand Majeau (May 3, 1916 in Verdun, Quebec – June 17, 1966) was a professional ice hockey player who played 56 games in the National Hockey League.  He played for the Montreal Canadiens. He won the Stanley Cup in 1944 with Montreal.

External links

1916 births
1966 deaths
Canadian ice hockey centres
Montreal Canadiens players
People from Verdun, Quebec
Stanley Cup champions
Ice hockey people from Montreal
Place of death missing
Quebec Senior Hockey League players